Tim Wendel (born 1956 Philadelphia) is an American writer whose books include narrative nonfiction and several novels. Those works include Summer of '68, Cancer Crossings, High Heat, Buffalo, Home of the Braves, and the popular sports novel Castro's Curveball. His stories and columns have appeared in many newspapers and magazines such as The New York Times, National Geographic, Esquire, USA Today, Psychology Today and Washington Post, among others.

He has been awarded the Professional Achievement Award and the Award for Teaching Excellence from Johns Hopkins University, both three times.

Early life
Wendel grew up in Lockport, New York, and spent his winters playing hockey and his summers sailing on Lake Ontario. Both are backdrops for his award-winning memoir, Cancer Crossings.

He has a bachelor's degree in magazine journalism from Syracuse University and a master's degree in writing from Johns Hopkins.

Career 
He is the author of more than a dozen books, including Summer of '68: The Season When Baseball, and America, Changed Forever which was named a top 10 choice by Publishers Weekly and was also named Notable Book of the Year 2013 by the Michigan State.

For 12 years, Wendel has been a writer in residence at Johns Hopkins University. He is also a recipient of the Walter E. Dakin Fellow and Tennessee Williams Scholar to the Sewanee Writers' Conference, beside being a Pen/Faulkner visiting writer to the Washington, D.C. Public Schools.

In 2005, Wendel co-wrote a piece that was a finalist for the Good Morning America national memoir contest. He also co-founded USA Today Baseball Weekly, which he edited and wrote for. Wendel has also been nominated three times for the Virginia Literary Award. He has won the USA Today Luminary Award.

Personal life 
He currently lives in Virginia with his wife, Jacqueline Salmon. They have two children.

References

External links
Tim Wendel on Huffington Post

Writers from Philadelphia
Living people
1956 births
American male writers